Adrian Michael Berry, 4th Viscount Camrose (15 June 1937 – 19 April 2016) was a British hereditary peer, journalist, and global warming denier.

Biography
Berry was born in 1937, the elder son of Michael Berry, who was later created Lord Hartwell, and disclaimed the family title of Viscount Camrose, by his marriage to Lady Pamela Smith, the daughter of F.E. Smith. Adrian Berry was educated at Eton and Christ Church, Oxford.

From 1977 until 1996, he was the science correspondent of The Daily Telegraph. On stepping down from that position he became the paper's Consulting Editor (Science). He was a Fellow of the Royal Geographical Society, a Fellow of the Royal Astronomical Society, and a Fellow of the British Interplanetary Society.

Marriage and family
On 4 January 1967, Berry married Marina Beatrice Sulzberger, daughter of Cyrus Sulzberger (a member of the family which owns The New York Times) and Marina Tatiana Ladas. The couple had two children:

 Hon Jessica Margaret Berry (born 11 February 1968)
 Jonathan William Berry, 5th Viscount Camrose (born 26 February 1970)

Climate change
In his article published in The Sunday Telegraph in 2015, Berry denied the scientific consensus on climate change by claiming that climate change "has more to do with the violent outbursts of energy that our solar system meets on its eternal passage through the Milky Way" than with carbon dioxide. Berry served on the advisory committee of the Global Warming Policy Foundation, a think tank that promotes climate-change denial and claims that policies proposed by governments to mitigate anthropogenic global warming are "extremely damaging and harmful".

Publications
The next ten thousand years: a vision of man's future in the universes (London: Cape, 1974), 
The iron sun: crossing the universe through black holes (London: Cape, 1977), 
From apes to astronauts (London: Daily Telegraph, 1980), 
High skies and yellow rain (London: Daily Telegraph, 1983)
The super-intelligent machine: an electronic odyssey (London: Cape, 1983), 
The Next 500 Years (London: Headline, 1995), 
Ice With Your Evolution (1986), 
Galileo and the dolphins: amazing but true stories from science (London: B.T. Batsford, 1996), 
The giant leap: mankind heads for the stars (London: Headline, 1999; rev. edn, London: Headline, 2000),

Arms

Sources
ThePeerage.com
Debrett's People of Today (12th edn, London: Debrett's Peerage, 1999), p. 157

References

External links

1937 births
2016 deaths
Alumni of Christ Church, Oxford
English male journalists
English physicists
English science writers
Fellows of the Royal Geographical Society
Fellows of the Royal Astronomical Society
Futurologists
People educated at Eton College
Writers from London
People from Oxford
4
Adrian Berry
Sulzberger family